Chen Xiaojun (born August 3, 1992) is a Chinese competitor in synchronized swimming. She won a silver medal in team competition at the 2012 Summer Olympics.

References 

Living people
Olympic silver medalists for China
Chinese synchronized swimmers
Olympic synchronized swimmers of China
Synchronized swimmers at the 2012 Summer Olympics
1992 births
Olympic medalists in synchronized swimming
Asian Games medalists in artistic swimming
Synchronized swimmers from Guangdong
People from Zhanjiang
Artistic swimmers at the 2010 Asian Games
Medalists at the 2012 Summer Olympics
Artistic swimmers at the 2014 Asian Games
World Aquatics Championships medalists in synchronised swimming
Synchronized swimmers at the 2011 World Aquatics Championships
Asian Games gold medalists for China
Medalists at the 2010 Asian Games
Medalists at the 2014 Asian Games